Smithton is a city in Pettis County, Missouri, United States. The population was 570 at the 2010 census.

History
Smithton was platted in 1859. It was named for Gen. George R. Smith, a railroad promoter, or for General Thomas A. Smith.

Geography
Smithton is located at  (38.680652, -93.092456).

Demographics

2010 census
At the census of 2010, there were 570 people, 206 households, and 151 families residing in the city. The racial makeup of the city was 94.9% White, 1.4% African American, 0.2% Native American, 0.2% Asian, 1.6% from other races, and 1.8% from two or more races. Hispanic or Latino of any race were 2.6% of the population.

There were 206 households, of which 43.2% had children under the age of 18 living with them, 53.4% were married couples living together, 17.0% had a female householder with no husband present, 2.9% had a male householder with no wife present, and 26.7% were non-families. 19.9% of all households were made up of individuals, and 5.9% had someone living alone who was 65 years of age or older. The average household size was 2.70 and the average family size was 3.13.

The median age in the city was 33.5 years. 32.6% of residents were under the age of 18; 7.6% were between the ages of 18 and 24; 27.9% were from 25 to 44; 22.4% were from 45 to 64; and 9.5% were 65 years of age or older. The gender makeup of the city was 48.2% male and 51.8% female.

2000 census
In 2000, the population density was 1/4 people per square mile (679.0/km). There were 212 housing units at an average density of 728.0 per square mile (282.3/km). The racial makeup of the city was 97.45% White, 0.78% Native American, 0.20% Asian, 0.39% from other races, and 1.18% from two or more races. Hispanic or Latino of any race were 0.59% of the population.

In the 2,000 houses in Smithton 99.9% that had children under the age of 18 living in them. Of these 53.4% were married couples living together, 19.0% had a female householder with no husband present, 4.3% were male householders with no wife present, and 23.3% were non-families. 20.1% of all households were made up of individuals, and 9.5% had someone living alone who was 65 years of age or older. The average household size was 2.70 and the average family size was 3.08.

In the city the population was spread out, with 32.7% under the age of 18, 8.0% from 18 to 24, 29.4% from 25 to 44, 19.4% from 45 to 64, and 10.4% who were 65 years of age or older. The median age of a smithton resident is 33 years old. For every 100 females age 18 and over, there were 91.6 males.

The median income for a household in the city was $32,321, and the median income for a family was $38,125. Males had a median income of $27,303 versus $20,125 for females. The per capita income for the city was $16,320. About 5.5% of families and 6.3% of the population were below the poverty line, including 9.7% of those under age 18 and of those age 65 or over.

Education
 Smithton High School
 Smithton Revival

References

Cities in Pettis County, Missouri
Cities in Missouri